Cotoletta alla Bolognese is a traditional dish of Bologna. It is also known as "Petroniana", after Petronius, a fifth century bishop and the patron saint of the city of Bologna.

It consists of a veal cutlet (scannello or sottonoce) coated with eggs, flour and breadcrumbs. It is first fried in lard or butter, then covered with a slice of ham and a handful of Parmesan cheese, then briefly sprinkled with meat broth to flavor and moisten it. Finally, it is baked in the oven until the cheese has melted.

It is often served with truffles, particularly "trifola", a small and fragrant white truffle from the Apennines near Bologna). Occasionally some tomato paste is added to the baking pan.

The recipe was deposited at the Italian Academy of Cuisine at the Chamber of Commerce of Bologna on 14 October 2004.

See also 

 Cotoletta alla milanese
 Faldìa
 Wiener Schnitzel

References

Other projects 

  Il Libro di cucina di Wikibooks contiene ricette relative a questo argomento

Cheese dishes
Breaded cutlets
Veal dishes
Italian cuisine